Long March 10, also known as the “Next Generation crewed launch vehicle” or “921 rocket”, is a Chinese super-heavy carrier rocket for crewed lunar missions that is currently under development. The nickname "921" refers to the founding date of China's human spaceflight program. Like the Long March 5, it uses 5-meter (16.4 ft) diameter rocket bodies and YF-100K engines, although with 7 engines on each of 3 cores. The launch weight is 2187 tonnes, delivering 25 tonnes into trans-lunar injection. The proposed crewed lunar mission uses two rockets; the crewed spacecraft and lunar landing stack launch separately and rendezvous in lunar orbit. Development was announced at the 2020 China Space Conference. As of 2022, the first flight of this triple-cored rocket is targeted for 2027.

See also 

 China National Space Administration
 Comparison of orbital launchers families
 Comparison of orbital launch systems
 Falcon Heavy
 Long March 9
 Shenzhou spacecraft
 Space program of China

References 

Long March (rocket family)
Rocket families
Space launch vehicles of China
Chinese brands